Evan Olav Ross-Naess (born August 26, 1988) is an American actor and musician. He made his acting debut in the comedy-drama film ATL (2006), and has since starred in the films Pride (2007), According to Greta (2009), Mooz-lum (2010), 96 Minutes (2011), Supremacy (2014), and The Hunger Games: Mockingjay – Part 1 (2014) and Part 2 (2015).

On television, Ross had a recurring role as Charlie Selby in the season 3 of The CW's teen drama series 90210 and a regular role as Angel Rivera in the season 2 of Fox's musical drama series Star. Ross also starred on ABC's procedural drama series Wicked City as Diver Hawkes. As a musician, he released his first single "Yes Me" in February 2011, and his second single "How To Live Alone" in May 2015.

Ross is the son of the lateshipping magnet and mountaineer Arne Næss Jr. and the Supremes lead singer Diana Ross. He has been married since 2014 to singer-songwriter Ashlee Simpson, with whom he has two children.

Early life
Ross was born Evan Olav Næss in Greenwich, Connecticut, to businessman and mountaineer Arne Næss Jr. and entertainer Diana Ross. His father was of German and Norwegian descent and his mother is African-American. His paternal great-uncle was Norwegian philosopher Arne Næss.

Ross has one older full brother, Ross Næss. His parents divorced in 2000. Ross has three older maternal half-sisters, Rhonda, whose biological father is Berry Gordy, and Tracee and Chudney from his mother's marriage to Robert Ellis Silberstein. He also has three older paternal half-siblings from his father's first marriage, Christoffer, Katinka, and Leona, and two younger paternal half-brothers from his father's third marriage, Nicklas and Louis. In January 2004, Ross' father was killed at age 66 in a mountain climbing accident near Cape Town.

Career

Acting
Ross began his career as an actor while a student at Greenwich High School. His first major role was in the film, ATL, released in March 2006, in which he co-starred with rappers T.I. and Big Boi. Ross received rave reviews for his role as troubled teenager Amare McCarter in the HBO television film Life Support, starring alongside Queen Latifah and his real-life half-sister Tracee Ellis Ross, who portrayed his elder sister in the film. Ross later co-starred in the biographical film Pride, in which he portrayed a good-natured teen with a speech impediment. He also appeared (uncredited) in an episode of Girlfriends. The episode, titled "What's Black-A-Lackin'?", also guest-starred Chrisette Michele, and was directed by his half-sister Tracee.

Ross has appeared in several other films, including the thriller Linewatch with Cuba Gooding, Jr. (2008), the drama Gardens of the Night (2008), and the crime drama film Life Is Hot in Cracktown (2009). He then starred as Julie, the love interest of Hilary Duff's character, in the 2009 comedy-drama film According to Greta. Ross has also appeared in The Notorious B.I.G. music video for the song "Nasty Girl" (2005), and the Lionel Richie music video for the song "Just Go" (2009).

In 2010, Ross joined the cast of The CW's teen drama series 90210 in its third season, portraying Liam Court's (Matt Lanter) half-brother and the love interest to Annie Wilson, played by Shenae Grimes. That same year, he appeared in Case 219, and the critically acclaimed film festival winner Mooz-lum, also starring Danny Glover and Nia Long. He then starred in the comedy-drama The Family Tree (2011) and co-starred alongside Brittany Snow in the thriller 96 Minutes, which was released April 28, 2012, in select theaters. Ross won the Breakout Acting Award at SXSW for his performance in the film.

In 2012, Ross had a supporting role in the Jay and Mark Duplass-directed comedy-drama Jeff, Who Lives at Home. The following year, he portrayed music producer Dallas Austin in the VH1 biopic CrazySexyCool: The TLC Story, about the 1990s Atlanta girl group TLC (the film was named after their second album CrazySexyCool). He then appeared in the drama film All the Wilderness (2014), which premiered at SXSW; the Courteney Cox-directed comedy-drama Just Before I Go (2014), which premiered at the Tribeca Film Festival; and the drama film Supremacy (2014), which premiered at the Los Angeles Film Festival.

Also in 2014, Ross portrayed the role of Messalla in The Hunger Games: Mockingjay – Part 1, released on November 21. He reprised the role in Mockingjay – Part 2, which was released on November 20, 2015. In July 2015, he joined the cast of ABC's crime drama series Wicked City, portraying crime scene paparazzo Diver Hawkes, replacing Darrell Britt-Gibson in the role. Ross has a major role as Angel Rivera in the second and third seasons of Fox's drama series Star. In 2018, Ross starred in a reality show alongside his wife Ashlee Simpson Ross called Ashlee+Evan, which lasted 6 episodes.

Music
In 2007, Ross began recording his debut album, which will encompass R&B and pop. After four years in the studio, Ross released his single "Yes Me" on February 25, 2011, which was produced by Tony DeNiro and written by DeNiro and Ross. Ross released a sneak preview of another song, "How To Live Alone", on his Instagram on December 5, 2014. On May 14, 2015, Ross released the song as a single, featuring rapper T.I. In 2016, Ross was featured on DJWS & Hero's song, "They". Ross is one-half of the duo, Ashlee + Evan, with his wife. Ross recorded the duets, "Don't Look At Me" and "All I Want" for the series Star with Brittany O'Grady. In 2017, Ross was featured on "Restricted" by Kronic. Ross and his wife released a duet collaboration, Ashlee + Evan, on October 12, 2018.

Personal life
Ross became engaged to singer-songwriter Ashlee Simpson in January 2014, and the two married on his mother's estate in Connecticut on August 30, 2014. They have two children together, a daughter named Jagger Snow Ross (born July 30, 2015) and a son named Ziggy Blu Ross (born October 29, 2020), and Ross is the step-father of Bronx Mowgli Wentz (born November 20, 2008), Simpson's son with her previous husband, musician Pete Wentz.

Filmography

Film

Television

Music videos

Awards and nominations

References

External links

 
 Evan Ross at Rotten Tomatoes

1988 births
Living people
21st-century American male actors
21st-century American musicians
African-American male actors
American male film actors
American male television actors
American people of German descent
American people of Norwegian descent
Male actors from Greenwich, Connecticut
Musicians from Greenwich, Connecticut
21st-century American male musicians
Greenwich High School alumni
21st-century African-American musicians
20th-century African-American people